Holodiscus dumosus is a species of flowering plant in the rose family, with the common names  mountain spray, rock-spiraea, bush oceanspray, and glandular oceanspray.

Distribution
The plant is native to western North America, where it occurs in northern Mexico and the Western United States.

It grows in many types of forest and shrubland habitats, and plant communities. For example, it is characteristic of and sometimes dominant in the understory of Douglas-fir, Ponderosa pine, and Arizona pine forests and oak woodlands.

In Colorado, New Mexico, Wyoming, and Idaho it occurs in the Rocky Mountains. It has been called "nearly ubiquitous" in many plant communities in Utah. In Arizona it occurs in the mountain wilderness of the Madrean Sky Islands such as the Chiricahua Mountains, sometimes in scree with Douglas-fir, and is a common plant in the Grand Canyon. In Nevada it is a component of quaking aspen and willow communities and sagebrush of the Great Basin region. In Mexico it is native to the states of Chihuahua and Baja California. It is also native to northern California and Texas.

The shrub tolerates a variety of soil types, as well as bare rock and rock fragments, such as crevices in cliffs and scree. It is drought-tolerant and survives in dry habitat, but it thrives in more moist locations, and can be found in wetter environments than its relative, Holodiscus discolor (creambush oceanspray). It can be found in cool, moist mountain forests in the central part of its range. It prefers sheltered locations that have less direct sunlight and wind. It anchors easily on steep slopes, and can grow on vertical topography, such as cliffs.

Description
The stems intricately branch from the root crown and spread outward. The branches have shreddy bark and the smaller reddish twigs may be slightly spiny. They are lobed or toothed.

The inflorescence is a feathery panicle of small, pinkish-white to cream colored flowers, each about 2 millimeters long. The bloom period is June through August. They are insect-pollinated.

Small seeds are produced in tiny, dry capsules. They are dispersed by the wind. The plant reproduces by seed and by sprouting from its root crown.

Varieties
Holodiscus dumosus var. cedrorus — endemic to serpentine soils in The Cedars area of Sonoma County, California.
 Holodiscus dumosus var.  dumosus — native to Colorado, Arizona, Nevada, Utah.
Holodiscus dumosus var. glabrescens — currently reclassified as Holodiscus discolor var. glabrescens.

Uses
Native American peoples such as the Paiute and Shoshoni utilized this as a traditional medicinal plant for ailments such as stomachaches and colds.

Early immigrant explorers used the wood to make nails.

Cultivation
Holodiscus dumosus is cultivated as an ornamental plant, used in part-shade wildlife gardens, natural landscaping design projects, and as a large container plant.

References

External links
 USDA Plants Profile for Holodiscus dumosus (rockspirea)
UC CalPhotos Gallery of Holodiscus dumosus

dumosus
Flora of the Northwestern United States
Flora of the Southwestern United States
Flora of the South-Central United States
Flora of Baja California
Flora of California
Flora of Chihuahua (state)
Flora of Western Canada
Flora of the Rocky Mountains
Plants described in 1898
Taxa named by Thomas Nuttall
Least concern flora of the United States
Plants used in traditional Native American medicine
Garden plants of North America